River Sarada is a medium-sized river in Visakhapatnam district of Andhra Pradesh, India.

The geographic coordinates of the river are north latitude 17 25 to 18 17 and east longitude of 82 32 to 83 06.

The catchment area of the basin is 2,665 square kilometers. It rises at an elevation of 1,000 meters in the Eastern Ghats. 
It runs eastwards for a distance 122 kilometers and joins the Bay of Bengal.

The basin is surrounded by River Nagavali in the north, 
River Gosthani, Gambiramgedda, Megadrigedda in the east 
Bay of Bengal in the South and
Machhkund sub-basin of the River Godavari in the west.

Visakhapatnam is the major city in the basin.
Yelamanchili and Anakapalli are important towns in the basin.

Historical Importance
The famous Bojjannakonda and Lingalakonda Buddhist cave monastery remains near Anakapalli and The Kotturu Dhanadibbalu near Gokivada forest entrance are located on the left bank of the river.
The River Sarada is a major base for irrigation in Visakha district.

Irrigation Projects
Pedderu medium irrigation project is constructed on Pedderu a tributary of the Sarada river near Ravipalem village. The project is aimed to irrigate  in the Madugula and Ravikamatham mandals in Visakhapatnam district. The catchment area of the reservoir site is extended over 160 square kilometers.
An Anacatta with two big gates, was constructed on the river near  Gokivada village to utilise the maximum water for irrigation in Yellamanchili, Ramballi, Atchutapuram mandals.

Raiwada dam with 93 million cubic meters live storage capacity was constructed in the year 1981 for supplying irrigation water.

References

Rivers of Andhra Pradesh
Geography of Visakhapatnam district
Rivers of India